Wafa Idris ( 1975 – January 27, 2002) was the first female suicide bomber in the Israeli–Palestinian conflict. At the time of her death, Idris was a 28-year-old, divorced Red Crescent Volunteer. She lived in the Am'ari Refugee Camp in Ramallah.

Early life
Idris' parents were refugees who lived in the Am'ari Refugee Camp having fled Ramla in Mandate Palestine in 1948 during the Nakba. She was born in the refugee camp in 1975. Her father died when she was a child. She was about 12 years old when the first intifada started in 1987. According to her relatives, Idris served on the Am'ari refugee camp's women's committee during the first intifada, where she assisted in food distribution at times of curfew, provided social support and helped prisoners' families. Idris married her first cousin when she was sixteen. She delivered a stillborn baby when she was 23 and was told that she would never be able to carry a baby to full term. Her husband divorced her and she moved back to live with her mother, a brother and his wife and five children. She then began volunteering for the Red Crescent Society and trained as a medic. According to the Red Crescent's coordinator of Emergency Response Services, Idris volunteered every Friday, the peak time during the intifada because of frequent riots after prayer, and for two or three days in a row  when there were riots during the week.

Attack
Idris detonated a 22-pound bomb in the center of Jerusalem outside a shoe store on Jaffa Road that killed her, Pinhas Tokatli (81), and injured more than 100 others. The attack took place on 27 January 2002 but the identity of the bomber wasn't confirmed until 30 January 2002. Idris carried the bomb in a backpack, rather than strapped to her body. Since, prior to this attack, women had only helped plant bombs, the use of a backpack and the lack of the usual note or video led to confusion regarding her suicide motives and speculation that she did not intend to detonate the bomb, but that the explosion was accidental. However, after investigation of the explosion, Israel declared Idris a suicide bomber around 9 February 2002.

Reaction
Shortly after the bombing, before the bomber had been identified, Hezbollah's TV channel reported that the bomber was named Shahanaz Al Amouri, from An-Najah National University in Nablus. Al-Aqsa Martyrs Brigade claimed responsibility for the attack a few days after the attack which they said Idris had carried out in response to Israeli military actions. Her family said that Idris was angered by seeing children shot and killed during confrontations in Ramallah. According to her mother, although Idris' three brothers were members of Fatah, she was not known to be an activist with any Palestinian militant group. As the first Palestinian woman to undertake such an attack, Idris received more international and regional media attention than Palestinian male bombers and two of the three Palestinian women bombers who followed her in 2002, with the exception of Ayat al-Akhras, the third and youngest Palestinian female suicide bomber. The bombing created intense interest in the Arab media with many newspapers describing Idris as a hero and a nationalist. An editorial published in Egypt's weekly newspaper Al-Sha'ab a few days after the bombing, stated, in part, "It is a woman who teaches you today a lesson in heroism, who teaches you the meaning of jihad, and the way to die a martyr's death ...It is a woman who has shocked the enemy with her thin, meager and weak body. It is a woman who blew herself up, and with her exploded all the myths about woman's weakness, submissiveness, and enslavement."

Legacy
In March 2011, Palestinian Media Watch reported that the Fatah-affiliated Al-Amari Palestinian youth center announced a football tournament named after Wafa Idris.

See also
Andalib Suleiman, 17-year-old female perpetrator of a 2002 Jerusalem marketplace suicide bombing
Ayat al-Akhras, 18- or 16-year-old female perpetrator of a 2002 suicide bombing at a Jerusalem supermarket
Hanadi Jaradat, 28-year-old female perpetrator of a 2003 suicide bombing inside a Haifa restaurant

Additional sources
"Wafa Idrees: A symbol of a Generation", Arabic Media Internet Network, 23 February 2002
"Filling in the Blanks on Palestinian Bomber", New York Times, 31 January 2002
The Palestinians see a `Joan of Arc', Haaretz, 2 February 2010
Female Suicide Bombers: Dying for Equality? - The Jaffee Center for Strategic Studies

References

Palestinian female murderers
Female suicide bombers
People from Ramallah and al-Bireh Governorate
1975 births
2002 deaths